The Dominican Republic has some traditional games.

Traditional games

El juego del pañuelo 
El juego del pañuelo is a game similar to steal the bacon.

Hoyito 
Hoyito is a mancala game.

Plaquita 
Plaquita is a game with similarities to street cricket.

Vitilla 
Vitilla is a type of street baseball in which a plastic water bottle cap and a broomstick replace the baseball and bat respectively.

References 

Dominican Republic-related lists